Billy Caskey (born 10 December 1954 in Belfast) is a retired professional soccer midfielder from Northern Ireland. He played in the Irish Football League, Football League, North American Soccer League and Major Indoor Soccer League. He also earned seven caps, scoring one goal, with the Northern Ireland national football team between 1978 and 1982.

Club career
Caskey began his career with Crusaders and East Belfast before moving to Glentoran in October 1974. Caskey played for Glentoran until 1978. He was named as the Northern Ireland Football Writers' Association Player of the Year for the 1976/77 season. In the summer of 1978, the team sent him on loan to the Tulsa Roughnecks of the North American Soccer League. When he returned to Glentoran in the fall, the team sent him and Victor Moreland to Derby County for £90,000. He played two seasons for Derby County, going on loan with Tulsa in 1979. In 1980, Derby County sold his contract to the Roughnecks. In 1983, Tulsa won the NASL championship, but Caskey was sidelined with a broken leg. In the fall of 1984, Caskey returned to Glentoran where he won the 1985 Irish Cup. In the spring of 1985, he returned to the United States and played for the Roughnecks who were now an independent team following the collapse of the NASL. In the fall, he signed with the Dallas Sidekicks of Major Indoor Soccer League. He holds the record for most penalty minutes (34) in the MISL whilst plying for the Dallas Sidekicks. Caskey was suspended from the MISL on 11 August 1986 for three seasons after assaulting a referee during Game 4 of the Dallas Sidekicks Eastern Division Semi-final series with Minnesota Strikers in 1986. This ended his indoor career. He was the first Sidekick ever to be ejected from a playoff game and to be expelled from the league. He returned to Northern Ireland and played with Glentoran until 1993. A year later, he signed with Dundela and completed his professional career with them in 1996. He then played with amateur teams, including Abbey Villa F.C. until 2005 when a knee injury forced him into retirement.

National team
On 11 November 1978, Caskey earned the first of his international caps, and scored his first and only goal, with the Northern Ireland national football team in a 2–0 victory over Bulgaria. He went on to play seven times with Northern Ireland, his last game coming in a 4–0 loss to France on 24 March 1982.

References

External links
NASL/MISL stats
Northern Ireland Footballing Greats: Caskey

1954 births
Living people
Association footballers from Northern Ireland
Northern Ireland Football Writers' Association Players of the Year
Dallas Sidekicks (original MISL) players
Derby County F.C. players
Dundela F.C. players
Glentoran F.C. players
NIFL Premiership players
Major Indoor Soccer League (1978–1992) players
North American Soccer League (1968–1984) indoor players
North American Soccer League (1968–1984) players
Expatriate association footballers from Northern Ireland
Northern Ireland international footballers
Tulsa Roughnecks (1978–1984) players
Association football forwards
Crusaders F.C. players
Association football midfielders